Scania AB is a major Swedish manufacturer headquartered in Södertälje, focusing on commercial vehicles—specifically heavy lorries, trucks and buses. It also manufactures diesel engines for heavy vehicles as well as marine and general industrial applications.

Scania was formed in 1911 through the merger of Södertälje-based Vabis and Malmö-based Maskinfabriks-aktiebolaget Scania. Since 1912, the company has been re-located again to Södertälje after the merger. Today, Scania has production facilities in Sweden, France, the Netherlands, Thailand, China, India, Argentina, Brazil, Poland, Russia and Finland. In addition, there are assembly plants in ten countries in Africa, Asia and Europe.  Scania's sales and service organisation and finance companies are worldwide.  In 2012, the company employed approximately 42,100 people around the world.

Scania was listed on the NASDAQ OMX Stockholm stock exchange from 1996 to 2014. The company is a subsidiary of Traton, part of the Volkswagen Group.

Scania's logo shows a griffin, from the coat of arms of the province of Scania.

History

Vabis and Maskinfabriks-aktiebolaget Scania

AB Scania-Vabis was established in 1911 as the result of a merger between Södertälje-based Vabis and Malmö-based Maskinfabriks-aktiebolaget Scania. Vagnfabriks Aktiebolaget i Södertelge (Vabis) was established as a railway car manufacturer in 1891, while Maskinfabriks-aktiebolaget Scania was established as a bicycle manufacturer in 1900. Both companies had tried their luck at building automobiles, trucks and engines, but with varied success. In 1910, Maskinfabriks-aktiebolaget Scania had succeeded in constructing reliable vehicles, while Vabis was at the brink of closing down. An offer from Per Alfred Nordeman, managing director of Maskinfabriks-aktiebolaget Scania, to steel manufacturer Surahammars Bruk, owner of Vabis, led to an agreement in November 1910, and in 1911 the merger was a reality.

Development and production of engines and light vehicles were set to Södertälje, while trucks were manufactured in Malmö. The company's logo was redesigned from Maskinfabriks-aktiebolaget Scania's original logo with the head of a griffin, the coat of arms of the Swedish region Scania (Skåne), centered on a three-spoke bicycle chainset. Initially the headquarters were located in Malmö, but in 1912 they were moved to Södertälje.

First World War and 1920s
Because there were many inexpensive, imported cars in Sweden at the time, Scania-Vabis decided to build high-class, luxury cars, for instance the type III limousine from 1920 that had a top hat holder in the roof. Prince Carl of Sweden owned a 1913 Scania-Vabis 3S, a type which was fitted with in-car buttons so the passenger could communicate with the driver. Scania-Vabis also built two-seat sports cars (or "sportautomobil").

For the next few years the company's profits stagnated, with around a third of their orders coming from abroad. The outbreak of the First World War, however, changed the company, with almost all output being diverted to the Swedish Army.  By 1916, Scania-Vabis was making enough profit to invest in redeveloping both of their production facilities.

Following the war, in 1919, Scania decided to focus completely on building trucks, abandoning other outputs including cars and buses. However, they were hurt by the swamping of the market with decommissioned military vehicles from the war, and by 1921 the company was bankrupt.

After some economic difficulties in 1921, new capital came from Stockholms Enskilda Bank owned by the Wallenberg family, and Scania-Vabis became a solid and technically, high standing, company.

Denmark
Towards the end of 1913, the company established a subsidiary in Denmark.  The following year the first Danish-built car, a four-seater Phaeton, was built at the company's Frederiksberg factory in Copenhagen.  In 1914, the factory produced Denmark's first Scania-Vabis truck, and following this developed a V8 engine, one of the first in the world.  In 1921, having sold around 175 trucks, and 75 cars, the Danish operation was closed down.

Norway
In 1917 an agreement was established with the newly formed Norwegian company Norsk Automobilfabrik A/S about production under license of Scania-Vabis cars and lorries. Production began in 1919, but was ended in 1921 after production of only 77 lorries, mostly built from Swedish produced parts.

1930s and 1940s
During the Second World War Scania produced a variety of military vehicles for the Swedish Army, including Stridsvagn m/41 light tanks produced under licence.

1950s and 1960s
During the 1950s, the company expanded its operations into new customer segments, becoming agents for the Willys Jeep and the Volkswagen Beetle, the latter being very profitable for Scania-Vabis. It also started to become a genuine competitor to Volvo with their new L71 Regent truck which was introduced in 1954.

During this period, Scania-Vabis expanded its dealer network and country-wide specialist workshop facilities. By the end of the 1950s, their market-share in Sweden was between 40 and 50%, and was achieving 70% in the heaviest truck sector – helped by the entrepreneurial efforts of their dealers into the haulier market.

Probably their largest impact was in export markets. Before 1950, exports accounted for only 10 percent of production output, but a decade later, exports were now at 50% of output. Beers in the Netherlands became a very important partner. Beers became official importers for Scania-Vabis in the Netherlands, and established a dealer network, along with training programmes for both mechanics and drivers. Beers also offered free twice-yearly overhauls of their customers vehicles, and offered a mobile service throughout the Netherlands with their custom-equipped service trucks. Due to Beers concerted efforts, Scania-Vabis market share in the country remained at a consistent 20% throughout this period. Scania-Vabis were to adopt the business model of Beers in their own overseas sales operations.

The 1960s saw Scania-Vabis expanding its production operations into overseas locations. Until now, all Scania-Vabis production had been carried out solely at Södertälje, but the 1960s saw the need to expand production overseas. Brazil was becoming a notable market for heavy trucks, and was also dependent on inter-urban buses, with particular requirement for Brazil's mountainous roads which became nigh-on impassable at times. On 2 July 1957, Brazilian subsidiary Scania-Vabis do Brasil S.A. (today known as Scania Latin America Ltda.) was established and started assembling some vehicles themselves in 1958. On 29 May 1959, a new engine plant was inaugurated in the Ipiranga district of São Paulo, and from June 1960, Scania-Vabis do Brasil assembled all vehicles themselves. Scania-Vabis vehicles had already been assembled in Brazil by a local company called Vemag (Veículos e Máquinas Agrícolas S.A.) for several years. Scania-Vabis established its first full manufacturing plant outside Södertälje, by building a new facility in São Bernardo do Campo near São Paulo, which was opened on 8 December 1962, and this was to set the standard for Scania-Vabis international operations.

Closer to home, the recently formed European Economic Community (EEC) offered further opportunities. Based on their now strong presence in the Dutch markets, Scania-Vabis constructed a new plant in Zwolle, which was completed in 1964. This new Dutch facility provided Scania-Vabis with a stepping stone into the other five EEC countries, particularly the German and French markets.

In 1966, Scania-Vabis acquired ownership of a then valuable supplier – Be-Ge Karosserifabrik, who were based in Oskarshamn. Be-Ge had been making truck cabs since 1946, and had been supplying cabs not only to Scania-Vabis, but also to their Swedish competitors Volvo. It was normal practice for truck manufacturers to outsource production of cabs to independent bodybuilders, so their acquisition by Scania-Vabis seemed a good move. Be-Ge owner Bror Göthe Persson had also established an additional cab factory at Meppel.

Scania-Vabis continued their expansion of production facilities through acquisitions. In 1967, they acquired Katrineholm based coachwork company Svenska Karosseri Verkstäderna (SKV), and created a new subsidiary, Scania-Bussar. A year later, all bus production, along with R&D was moved to Katrineholm. Further production locations were added at Sibbhult and Falun, and Scania's employee numbers rose, particularly at Södertälje, which was to help double the town's population.

Scania-Vabis at some point in their history also manufactured trucks in Botswana, Brazil, South-Korea, Tanzania, the Netherlands, Zimbabwe and the United States.

For some time Daimler-Benz waged a 'logo war' with Scania-Vabis, claiming a possible confusion between the Scania-Vabis 'pedal crank' design featuring on Scania bicycles around 1900 and the Mercedes 'three-pointed star'. In 1968, Daimler-Benz won and the Scania-Vabis logo changed to a simple griffin's head on a white background.

In February 1968, a new range of trucks was launched, and at the same time the company was rebranded as just Scania. In addition to Vabis disappearing from the name and a new logo, all current models received new model designations.

1970s and 1980s

In 1976, the Argentinian industrial complex was launched. A few months later, on 10 September, the first gearbox outside of Sweden was manufactured and finally in December an L111 truck became the first Scania made in Argentina. Soon the plant specialised in the production of gearboxes, axles and differentials that equipped both the units produced in Tucumán and those built in Brazil.

Also in Argentina, in 1982 the Series 2 was launched as part of the "Scania Program", consisting of the T-112 and R-112 trucks with two cab versions and different options in engine and load capacity. In 1983, was launched the K112 made in Tucuman (like the rest models) for replace the BR-116.

In mid-1985 Scania entered the US market for the first time (aside from having sold 12,000 diesel engines installed in Mack trucks from 1962 until 1975), starting modestly with a goal of 200 trucks in all of 1987 (121 trucks were sold during calendar year 1986). Scania limited their marketing to New England, where conditions resemble those in Europe more closely.

Many examples of Scania, Vabis and Scania-Vabis commercial and military vehicles can be seen at the Marcus Wallenberg-hallen (the Scania Museum) in Södertälje.

Ownership

Saab-Scania AB (1969–1995)
On 1 September 1969, Scania merged with Saab AB, and formed Saab-Scania AB. When Saab-Scania was split in 1995, the name of the truck and bus division changed simply to Scania AB. One year later, Scania AB was introduced on the stock exchange, which resulted in a minor change of name to Scania AB (publ).

Aborted Volvo takeover
On 7 August 1999, Volvo announced it had agreed to acquire a majority share in Scania.  Volvo was to buy the 49.3% stake in Scania that was owned by Investor AB, Scania's then main shareholder.  The acquisition, for US$7.5 billion (60.7 billion SEK), would have created the world's second-largest manufacturer of heavy trucks, behind DaimlerChrysler.  The cash for the deal was to come from the sale of Volvo's car division to Ford Motor Company in January 1999.

The merger failed, after the European Union disapproved, announcing one company would have almost 100% market share in the Nordic markets.

Aborted MAN takeover
In September 2006, the German truckmaker MAN AG launched a €10.3bn hostile offer to acquire Scania AB.  Scania's CEO Leif Östling was forced to apologise for comparing the bid of MAN to a "Blitzkrieg".  MAN AG later dropped its hostile offer, but in January 2008, MAN increased their voting rights in Scania up to 17%.

Volkswagen Group era
Scania AB is 100% owned by the German automotive company Volkswagen Group, forming part of its heavy commercial vehicle subsidiary, Traton, along with MAN Truck & Bus, Volkswagen Caminhões e Ônibus and Navistar.

Volkswagen gained ownership of Scania by first buying Volvo's stake in 2000, after the latter's aborted takeover attempt, increasing it to 36.4% in the first quarter 2007. It then bought out Investor AB in March 2008, raising its share to 70.94%. The deal was approved by regulatory bodies in July 2008. Scania then became the ninth marque in the Volkswagen Group. By 1 January 2015, Volkswagen controlled 100% of the shares in Scania AB.

Price-fixing fines
In September 2017, Scania was fined 880 million euros (8.45bn Swedish krona) by the EU for taking part in a 14-year price fixing cartel. The other five members of the cartel – Daimler, DAF, MAN, Iveco and Volvo/Renault – settled with the commission in 2016.

Products

Trucks and special vehicles

Scania develops, manufactures and sells trucks with a gross vehicle weight rating (GVWR) of more than 16 tonnes (Class 8), intended for long-distance haulage, regional, and local distribution of goods, as well as construction haulage.

The 1963 forward-control LB76 forged Scania-Vabis's reputation outside Sweden, being one of the first exhaustively crash-tested truck cabs.

Current
All current trucks from Scania are part of the PRT-range, but are marketed as different series based on the general cab height.
L-series – launched in December 2017. It has an even lower cab than the P-series, and is optimised for distribution and other short-haul duties.
P-series – launched in August 2004, typical applications are regional and local distribution, construction, and various specialised operations associated with locally based transportation and services.  P-series trucks have the new P cabs, which are available in several variations: a single-berth sleeper, a spacious day cab, a short cab and a crew cab
G-series – launched in September 2007, the series offer an enlarged range of options for operators engaged in national long haul and virtually all types of construction applications.  All models have a G cab, and each is available as a tractor or rigid. The G-series truck comes with five cab variants: three sleepers, a day cab and a short cab. There are different axle configurations, and in most cases a choice of chassis height and suspension
R-series – launched in March 2004, and won the prestigious International Truck of the Year award in 2005 and again in 2010. The range offers various trucks optimised for long haulage. All models have a Scania R cab, and each vehicle is available as a tractor or rigid. There are different axle configurations and a choice of chassis height and suspension. The Scania R 730 is the most powerful variant of the R-series.
S-series – launched in August 2016. It is the highest cab Scania has ever built. It features a completely flat floor and a low bed that is extendable up to 100 cm (about 3.28 feet).

Historical

 CLb/CLc (1911–27)
 DLa (1911–26)
 ELa (1912–26)
 FLa (1911–24)
 GLa (1914–23)
 314/324/325 (1925–36)
 335/345/355 (1931–44)
 L10/F10/L40/F40/L51 Drabant (1944–59)
 L20/L60/L71 Regent (1946–58)
 L75/L76/LB76 (1958–68)
 L55/L56/L66 (1959–68)
 L36 (1964–68)
 50, 80, 85, 110, 140 (1968–74)
 81, 86, 111, 141 (1974–81)
 2-series: 82, 92, 112, 142 (1980–88)
 3-series: 93, 113, 143 (1987–97)
 4-series: 94, 114, 124, 144, 164 (1995–2004)
 T-series (2004–05) – former part of the PRT-range

Buses and coaches
Scania's bus and coach range has always been concentrated on chassis, intended for use with anything between tourist coaches to city traffic, but ever since the 1950s, when the company was still known as Scania-Vabis, they have manufactured complete buses for their home markets of Sweden and the rest of Scandinavia, and since the 1990s even for major parts of Europe.

Chassis

Scania-Vabis was involved in bus production from its earliest days, producing mail buses in the 1920s.

In 1946, the company introduced their B-series of bus chassis, with the engine mounted above the front-axle, giving a short front overhang and the door behind the front-axle. The first generation consisted of the B15/B16, the B20/B21/B22 and the B31, primarily divided by weight class, and then by wheelbase. The latter became upgraded in 1948 and renamed 2B20/2B21/2B22 and 3B31. The T31/T32 trolleybus chassis was also available from 1947. In 1950, the next generation was introduced, with the B41/B42, the B61/B62/B63/B64 and later the B83. From then, Scania-Vabis also offered the BF-series chassis, available as BF61/BF62/BF63, which had the engine more conventionally mounted before the front-axle, leaving room for the door on a longer front overhang. From 1954, the B-series came as B51 and B71, and the BF as BF71 and later BF73. In 1959, the B55, B65 and B75, plus the BF75 were introduced, and were from 1963 available as B56, B66 and B76, plus the BF56 and BF76.

Before the rebranding to Scania in 1968, Scania-Vabis had delivered a very limited number of CR76 chassis-frameworks (less actual bodywork) with transversally rear-mounted engine for external bodying, based on the complete bus with the same name. From 1968 it was also delivered as a standard bus chassis known as BR110.
The other chassis models were renamed too, so the Scania-Vabis B56/B76 became the Scania B80/B110 and the BF56/BF76 became BF80/BF110. The numbers in the new model designations were based on the engine displacement (8 and 11-litre), a scheme that Scania used for almost 40 years.

In 1971, a new range of longitudinally mounted rear-engined chassis was launched, with the BR85 and its larger brother, the V8-powered 14-litre BR145, targeted at the coach market. In Brazil, the higher powered version was equipped with the standard 11-litre instead of the V8, known as the BR115. Also the BR111 was launched as the replacement for the BR110, being derived from the CR111 complete bus. In 1976, many of the models were renewed, and designations were upped from 80 and 85 to 86, and from 110 to 111, except the BR145 which was later replaced by the BR116 in 1978.

The BR112 was launched in 1978 as a forerunner to the 2-series, replacing the BR111. The rest of the 2-series were launched in 1981 with the F82/F112 replacing the BF86/BF111 and the S82/S112 replacing the B86/B111, and then in 1982 the K82/K112 replacing the BR86/BR116. The BR112 was then updated to the N112 in 1984, and a tri-axle version of the K112 became available, known as the K112T. In 1985, the K82 and F82 were replaced by the 8.5-litre engined K92 and F92. Front-engined versions were in general discontinued on the European markets in the mid-1980s, but production continued in Brazil.

In 1988, the 3-series was introduced, continuing the main models of the 2-series. In 1990, the new L113 became available, with a longitudinally rear-mounted engine which was inclined 60° to the left, to make a lower height than the K113. The 4-series was launched in 1997, continuing all model characteristics from the 3-series, but with all of them being just modular configurations of the basic chassis. The 8.5-litre engine was replaced by a 9-litre, and the 11-litre was replaced by an 11.7-litre. They were joined by a 10.6-litre engine in 2000.

The current Scania's bus and coach range has been available since 2006, and is marketed as the K-series, N-series and F-series, based on the engine position.

Current 

K series – rear-engined (longitudinal mounted) with Euro III – Euro VI compliant engines
N series – rear-engined (transversal mounted) with Euro III – Euro VI compliant engines
F series – front-engined with Euro III and Euro V compliant engines

Historical 

B55/B56/B65/B66/B75/B76/B80/B110
BF56/BF75/BF76/BF80/BF110
BR110
BR85/BR115/BR145
B86/B111
BF86/BF111
BR111
BR86/BR116
2-series: BR112/N112, F82/F92/F112, K82/K92/K112, S82/S112
3-series: F93/F113, K93/K113, L113, N113, S113
4-series: F94, K94/K114/K124, L94, N94

Complete buses

Scania-Vabis' first complete bus model was the transversally rear-engined commuter bus Metropol (C50), which was built in the workshop in Södertälje on licence from the Mack C50 in 1953–1954 for customer Stockholms Spårvägar. It was followed in 1955 by the slightly shorter city bus version Capitol (C70/C75/C76), which was manufactured until 1964. In 1959, the front-engined CF-series was introduced with the CF65 and CF75 (later CF66 and CF76). The CF-series was built until 1966.

In 1965, the rear-engined CR76 was introduced as a replacement for the Capitol. It was available in two versions; the CR76M with double doors (2-2-0) for city and suburban traffic, and the CR76L with single doors (1-1-0) for longer distances. Because of Sweden's switch to right-hand traffic in September 1967 and the need for new buses with doors on the right-hand side, the model sold well. With the rebranding from Scania-Vabis to Scania in 1968, the model was renamed CR110 (CR110M and CR110L). In 1967, the coachwork manufacturer Svenska Karosseri Verkstäderna (SKV) in Katrineholm was acquired, and all production of bus chassis soon moved there too. Together with the rebranding in 1968, Scania re-introduced the front-engined CF range for customers in Sweden as a body-on-chassis product with the newly acquired SKV's former bodywork model "6000" on standard Scania chassis, but less than 100 were delivered until 1970. The CF110L (BF110 chassis) was the most successful, while a handful of C80L (B80) and C110L (B110) were made.

In 1971, the CR110 was upgraded and became the CR111. With extended sound-proofing for its time, it was marketed as the "silent bus". The same year, Scania also introduced a new range of longitudally rear-engined coaches known as the CR85 and the CR145. While CR85 had the small 8-litre engine, the CR145 was powered by a 14-litre V8 engine. The coaches were built until 1978, but never sold very well. In 1973, one right-hand drive CR145 prototype was built in Sweden, with the finishing touches done by MCW, but it remained the only one of its kind. The CR111 was replaced by the all-new CR112 in 1978. With its angular design, the CR112 was called a "shoebox". As with the BR112 chassis being renamed the N112, the CR112 was renamed the CN112 in 1984, and it was also launched in an articulated version. A North American version of the CN112 was built in around 250 units between 1984 and 1988. The CK112 was launched as a simple coach or intercity bus in 1986, sharing most of the styling with the CN112. With the launch of the 3-series in 1988, both the CN112 and CK112 were upgraded to CN113 and CK113. The CK113 was replaced by the L113-based CL113 in 1991 with new rectangular headlights, but production ended in 1992. Less than 100 units of the CK112/CK113/CL113 were ever built.

The MaxCi (CN113CLL), launched in 1992, was Scania's first ever low-entry bus, with a low floor between the front and centre doors, and kneeling to make entering even easier. The bodywork was based on the CN113, but with a lowered window line in the front half, and a new front including the headlights from the CL113. In 1996, the aluminium body OmniCity was launched as Scania's first full low-floor bus, and in 1998 the MaxCi was replaced by the OmniLink, which shared styling with the OmniCity. A step-entrance intercity bus returned with the OmniLine in 2000. In 2007, Scania returned to the complete coach market with the Finnish-built OmniExpress, which in 2011 even replaced the OmniLine, which had gone out of production in 2009.

Scania's current styling was first seen in 2009, with the launch of the Touring coach, manufactured by Higer Bus in China, and in 2011 the Citywide was launched to replace both the OmniCity and the OmniLink. Scania in India launched their very own Metrolink coach in 2013, built at their plant there. The Interlink was then launched in October 2015 to replace the OmniExpress. The latest addition to Scania's complete bus models is the Fencer range featuring buses to coaches, the F1 single decker bus was launched in May 2021 initially for the UK market and available in diesel and electric drivetrains.

Current 

Citywide – low-floor and low-entry city bus range
Fencer – low-floor urban, intercity and coach range
Interlink – coach and intercity bus range
Metrolink – coach for India
Touring – premium coach, manufactured by Higer Bus

Historical 

Metropol (C50) – rear-engined step-entrance commuter bus
Capitol (C70/C75/C76) – rear-engined step-entrance city bus
CF65/CF75/CF66/CF76 – front-engined step-entrance city/intercity bus
CR76/CR110/CR111 – rear-engined step-entrance city/intercity bus
C80/C110/CF110 – front-engined step-entrance city/intercity bus
CR85/CR145 – rear-engined coach
CR112/CN112/CN113 – rear-engined step-entrance city/intercity bus (rigid/articulated)
CK112/CK113/CL113 – rear-engined intercity bus
MaxCi (CN113CLL) – low-entry city bus
OmniCity – low-floor city bus (rigid/articulated/double-decker)
OmniExpress – coach and intercity bus range
OmniLink – low-entry city bus (rigid/articulated)
OmniLine – intercity bus

Buses through collaborations

In addition to supplying chassis for external bodywork, and their own bodyworks, Scania have also collaborated with some bodywork manufacturers to deliver buses through Scania's distribution lines, both on a global base and on smaller markets.

In 1969, Scania teamed up with MCW to make the Metro-Scania single-decker for the UK market based on the BR110MH, and since 1971 the BR111MH chassis. In 1973, it was replaced by the Metropolitan double-decker, built on the BR111DH chassis. Production ended in 1978, when the BR111 was replaced by the BR112. East Lancashire Coachbuilders (ELC) launched their low-entry MaxCi in 1993, one year after Scania's own left-hand drive version. It was followed by the L113-based European in 1995 until 1996. In 2003, ELC was back with both the OmniDekka double-decker and the OmniTown midibus to complement Scania's own OmniCity.

Since the mid-1990s, Scania started a long-lasting collaboration with Spanish bus builder Irizar to sell their coaches through Scania's global distribution network. The agreement meant that Scania had exclusive distribution rights for all Irizar coaches in Northern Europe for many years. The most widespread model was the Irizar Century, but later also the Irizar PB was sold as Scania's premium coach.

In 1985, Scania's Norwegian distributor and the Finnish bus builder Ajokki announced the Scania Classic, a coach built exclusively for Norway. It was technically based on Ajokki's own Royal coach model, but received its own styling details. In 1990, when Ajokki had become Carrus, the second generation was launched based on the Vector/Regal models. The third generation from 1995 was also available in Sweden and Finland in limited numbers, and the fourth and last generation from 2001 was built with the same bodywork as the Volvo 9700. Volvo, who had bought Carrus in 1998, put the foot down against any further Scanias with this bodywork from 2002, and since then Scania instead put the "Classic" sticker on all Irizar Century sold in Norway for several years. The collaboration also led to some Norway-exclusive intercity buses; the Scania Cruiser (Ajokki Victor), Scania Universal (Carrus Fifty) and Scania InterClassic (Carrus Vega), but neither of these had special styling, nor as successful as the Classic.

In 2006, Scania and Higer Bus announced the A80, the first coach in the Higer A Series of coaches built on Scania chassis in China. The coaches are generally available in Asia, but the A30 is also available in Europe as an affordable intercity bus or simple coach. Even the A80 is globally available, but under make-up known as the Scania Touring HD, also referred to as the A80T.

Since 2012, Scania and Belgian bus manufacturer Van Hool offer some of their most luxurious coaches from their TX series on Scania K EB chassis, including the Astronef with theatrical floor, the Astromega double-decker and the Altano. Since 2014, also the Exqui.City BRT concept is available on Scania N UA chassis with CNG-powered engines.

Diesel engines
In addition to bus and truck engines, Scania's industrial and marine engines are used in generator sets and in earthmoving and agricultural machinery, as well as on board ships and pleasure crafts.

Scania's involvement with internal combustion engine production dates back to 1897, when engineer Gustav Erickson designed the engine for the company's first motor car.  Over the subsequent years, Scania has grown to be one of the world's most experienced engine manufacturers, building engines not only for trucks and buses, but also for marine and general industrial applications, which are exported across the globe.

Year in parentheses is first year of application in road vehicles.

Current

DC07 I6  cc (2014) − licensed Cummins ISB 6.7 for buses
DC09/DI09 I5  cc (2007)
DC13/DI13 I6  cc (2007)
DC16/DI16 V8  cc (2010)

Historical

D10/DS10 I6  cc (1958)
D7 I6  cc (1959)
D8/DS8 I6  cc (1962)
D11/DN11/DS11/DSC11/DSI11 I6  cc (1963)
D5/DS5 I4  cc (1964)
DI14/DS14/DSC14/DSI14 V8  cc (1969)
DC9/DI9/DN9/DS9/DSC9 I6  cc (1984)
DC9 I6  cc (1996)
DH12/DI12/DSC12/DSI12/DT12 I6  cc (1996)
DC11 I6  cc (1999)
DC16 I6  cc (2000)
DC9 I5  cc (2004)

Other products
Scania also designs and manufacture clothes especially designed for truckers under the label Scania Truck Gear.
Scania is featured in Scania Truck Driving Simulator and Euro Truck Simulator 2, both developed by SCS Software.

Production sites
The table below shows the locations of the current and former production facilities of Scania AB.  As Scania is now majority owned by Volkswagen AG, making it part of Volkswagen Group, the table also includes Volkswagen Group references.

Notes: the second column of the table, the 'factory VIN ID code', is indicated in the 11th digit of the vehicles' 17 digit Vehicle Identification Number, and this factory code is only assigned to plants which produce complete vehicles. Component factories which do not produce complete vehicles do not have this factory ID code.

 
In 2015 Scania opened its first Asian Plant in Bangalore, Karnataka, India. This plant specialises in bus and coach making.

In November 2020 Scania bought truck company Nantong Gaokai based in China's eastern city of Rugao to start the plan of vehicles production there.

Former production site

See also

 Ainax – holding company created after an attempted acquisition of Scania by Volvo
 Marcus Wallenberg-hallen – Swedish vehicle museum, including Scania vehicles
 List of Volkswagen Group diesel engines – includes all current Scania engines

References

External links 

 
 The Scania Museum – Marcus Wallenberg Hall

 
Traton
Companies formerly listed on Nasdaq Stockholm
Bus manufacturers of Sweden
Truck manufacturers of Sweden
Vehicle manufacturing companies established in 1911
Motor vehicle engine manufacturers
Engine manufacturers of Sweden
Emergency services equipment makers
Diesel engine manufacturers
Multinational companies headquartered in Sweden
Companies based in Södertälje
Södertälje Municipality
Swedish brands
Swedish companies established in 1911
Marine engine manufacturers
Electrical generation engine manufacturers
1996 initial public offerings
2014 mergers and acquisitions